SH2-domain containing Phosphatidylinositol-3,4,5-trisphosphate 5-phosphatase 2 is an enzyme that in humans is encoded by the INPPL1 gene.

INPPL1 encodes inositol polyphosphate-5 phosphatase-like 1, a protein that in addition to the phosphatase domain contains an SH2 (src-homology domain 2) motif.

Interactions 

INPPL1 has been shown to interact with:
 BCAR1, 
 FLNC, 
 SHC1, and
 SORBS1.

References

Further reading 

EC 3.1.3